Faisal Zaman is a Pakistani politician hailing from Haripur District, who had been a member of the Khyber Pakhtunkhwa Assembly from August 2018 till January 2023. He also served as the chairman and a member of different committees.

Political career
Faisal Zaman was elected as the member of the Khyber Pakhtunkhwa Assembly on ticket of Pakistan Tehreek-e-Insaf from PK-52 (Haripur-IV) in 2013 Pakistani general election. In 2018, he was expelled from PTI for allegedly selling his vote in the Senate polls. 

He ran again for the PK-42 Haripur seat in 2018 General Elections and won as an Independent candidate. In 2021, he was arrested on murder case of Pakistan Tehreek-e-Insaf (PTI) provincial deputy general secretary Malik Tahir Iqbal. In April 2022, he escaped from the MPA hostel which was declared as a sub-jail.

References

Living people
Pashtun people
Khyber Pakhtunkhwa MPAs 2013–2018
People from Haripur District
Pakistan Tehreek-e-Insaf politicians
Year of birth missing (living people)